Tabreh-ye Olya (also Romanized as Ţabreh-ye ‘Olyā and Ţabareh-ye ‘Olyā; also known as Ţabareh, Tabra, Ţabreh-ye Bālā,Ţabrīyeh-ye Bālā, and Tāpreh) is a village in Abdoliyeh-ye Gharbi Rural District, in the Central District of Ramshir County, Khuzestan Province, Iran. At the 2006 census, its population was 74, in 10 families.

References 

Populated places in Ramshir County